Pseudojana vitalisi is a moth in the family Eupterotidae. It was described by L. Candèze in 1927. It is found in South-East Asia.

References

Moths described in 1927
Eupterotinae